Dhruv Singh can refer to:

 Dhruv Pratap Singh (born 1960), Indian politician
 Dhruv Pratap Singh (cricketer) (born 1997), Indian cricketer
 Dhruv Narayan Singh (born 1959), Indian politician